Aitor Gabilondo (born 1972) is a Spanish screenwriter and television producer.

Biography 
Aitor Gabilondo was born in San Sebastián in 1972. He began his career as a writer in Cadena SER, Canal+, and ETB. In 2017, following his exit from Plano a Plano (which he founded together with César Benítez), he co-founded the production company Alea Media, a joint venture with Mediaset España.

His credits as television creator include El Príncipe, Allí abajo, La verdad, Vivir sin permiso, Patria, Madres. Amor y vida, Entrevías (Wrong Side of the Tracks), Besos al aire (Blowing Kisses), and El silencio (Mute).

Accolades

References 

21st-century Spanish screenwriters
Spanish television producers
People from San Sebastián
1972 births
Living people